Hvalsey Church was a Catholic church in the abandoned Greenlandic Norse settlement of Hvalsey (now modern-day Qaqortoq). The best preserved Norse ruins in Greenland, the church was also the location of the last written record of the Greenlandic Norse, a wedding in September 1408.

History
According to the sagas, the land around Hvalsey was claimed by Thorkell Farserk, a relative of Erik the Red. Christianity arrived in Greenland around the year 1000 and churches began to be built in the country. It is thought that Hvalsey Church was built in the early 14th century, but archaeological finds hint that this was not the first church in this site. The church is mentioned in several late medieval documents as one of the 10-14 parish churches in the Eastern Settlement.

The church hosted the wedding of Thorstein Olafsson and Sigrid Björnsdóttir on either 14 or 16 September 1408. The wedding was mentioned in letters from a priest at Garðar and by several Icelanders, and is the last written record of the Greenlandic Norse. The married couple later settled in Olafsson's native Iceland.

According to Inuit legend, there was open war between the Norse chief Ungortoq and the Eskimo leader K'aissape. The Eskimos made a massive attack on Hvalsey and burned the Norse inside their houses but Ungortoq escaped with his family. K'aissape defeated him after a long pursuit which ended near Cape Farewell. However, according to archaeological studies, there is no sign of a conflagration.

The site is now part of a sheep farm.

Buildings
The church is located in a classic Greenlandic Norse farmstead, with several additional adjacent buildings. It had eleven rooms, combining living quarters, an  banqueting hall and livestock pens. There were other livestock pens away from the main building, a horse enclosure for visitors to keep their horses, a storage building further up the hill and a warehouse at the edge of the water.

The dwelling was built on the top of an earlier building that dates back to the time of Erik the Red, and may have been Thorkell Farserk's home.

Architecture
The church held around 30–35 people, and was surrounded by a dyke marking the limits of the cemetery.

It was built from granite fieldstones. The stones are carefully laid and fitted. Some of the stones weigh between 4 and 5 tonnes, and some even more. Mortar was also used, but it is not known if it was used between the stones or only as plaster on the outside walls. The mortar was made from crushed shells so the church would have been white when built. Qaqortoq means "the white place", and the modern town of that name at the mouth of the fjord could have got its name by association with the church.

It is thought that it had a turf-covered wooden roof. All doors and windows are constructed using lintels, except for one window in the eastern gable, which had an arch. The window openings are wider on the inside, a detail not found in Icelandic churches, but well known in early churches in Britain which may have been the source of this building type.

Thanks to the good construction quality, Hvalsey Church has resisted the elements better than other Norse structures in Greenland. Nevertheless, it has partly collapsed, mainly because it was built over a graveyard. Graves were not removed before the construction and this caused the sinking of the foundation.

Gallery

See also
Greenlandic Norse people
Norse colonization of North America

References

Roman Catholic churches in Greenland
Ruins in Greenland
Hvalsey
Church ruins